The 12849 / 12850 Bilaspur–Pune Superfast Express is a superfast train belonging to South East Central Railway zone that runs between  and  in India. It is currently being operated with 12849/12850 train numbers on a weekly basis.

Service

12849  Bilaspur–Pune Superfast Express has an average speed of 59 km/hr and covers 1302 km in 22h 10m. The 12850 Pune–Bilaspur Superfast Express has an average speed of 56 km/hr and covers 1302 km in 23h 10m.

Route & Halts 

The important halts of the train are:

Coach composition

The train has standard ICF rakes with max speed of 110 kmph. The train consists of 22 coaches:

 1st AC cum AC II Tier
 1 AC II Tier
 4 AC III Tier
 10 Sleeper coaches
 2 General Unreserved
 2 EOG

Traction

Rake sharing

The train shares its rake with 12851/12852 Bilaspur–Chennai Central Superfast Express.

Direction reversal

The train reverses its direction 1 times:

See also 
 Bilaspur Junction railway station
 Pune Junction railway station
 Bilaspur–Chennai Central Superfast Express

Notes

References

External links 

 12849/Bilaspur - Pune SF Express
 12850/Pune - Bilaspur SF Express

Transport in Bilaspur, Chhattisgarh
Transport in Pune
Express trains in India
Rail transport in Chhattisgarh
Rail transport in Maharashtra
Railway services introduced in 2008